Heteropsis eliasis is a butterfly in the family Nymphalidae. It is found in the Democratic Republic of the Congo and Angola.

References

Elymniini
Butterflies described in 1866
Butterflies of Africa
Taxa named by William Chapman Hewitson